Tommaso Vincenzi (died 1478) was a Roman Catholic prelate who served as Bishop of Pesaro (1475–1478) and Bishop of Terni (1472–1475).

Biography
On 31 August 1472, Tommaso Vincenzi was appointed during the papacy of Pope Sixtus IV as Bishop of Terni.
On 29 May 1475, he was appointed during the papacy of Pope Sixtus IV as Bishop of Pesaro.
He served as Bishop of Pesaro until his death on 8 September 1478.

References

External links and additional sources
 (for Chronology of Bishops) 
 (for Chronology of Bishops) 
  (for Chronology of Bishops) 
  (for Chronology of Bishops) 

16th-century Italian Roman Catholic bishops
Bishops appointed by Pope Sixtus IV
1478 deaths